Hamidpur is a village located in Narela tehsil of North West Delhi district in Delhi, India. According to Census 2011 information, the location code or village code of Hamidpur village is 063870.

Demographics 
Hamidpur has a total population of 3,469 people. There are about 644 houses in Hamidpur village.

References 

Villages in North West Delhi district